Antinous (111–130 CE) was the favorite and lover of Roman Emperor Hadrian.

Antinous can also refer to:

Arts

Literature
Antinous son of Eupeithes, one of the chief suitors of Penelope in Homer's Odyssey
Antinous, a 1918 collection of English verse by Portuguese poet Fernando Pessoa

Music
Antinous, a 1990s composition by António Chagas Rosa

Sculpture
Antinous Farnese, a statue of Hadrian's favorite, once owned by the Farnese family
Antinous Mondragone, a colossal bust of Hadrian's favorite, discovered at Frascati before 1730
Capitoline Antinous, a statue discovered in the 18th century at Hadrian's Villa, now believed to be a Roman copy of a statue of Hermes
Statue of Antinous (Delphi), a statue discovered in 1894 at Delphi, Greece
Townley Antinous, a portrait head of Antinous wearing an ivy wreath

Astronomy
Antinous (constellation), an obsolete constellation, originally named by Hadrian after his favorite
Antinous (crater), a feature of Tethys, a moon of Saturn
1863 Antinous, an asteroid discovered in 1948, named for the Homeric figure

People
 Antinous of Epirus (died 168 BCE), a Molossian chieftain

Ships
 Antinous, French renaming of the SMS Wolf (auxiliary cruiser) of the Imperial German Navy, scrapped in 1931
 , an American 6,000 ton merchant vessel sunk by the German submarine U-512 in 1942
 SS Antinous (1943), a Type C2 ship transferred to the United States Navy as USS Baxter (APA-94), sold in 1947 and scrapped in 1968
 , a Type C2 ship scrapped in 1970